Gabi Bauer (born 21 July 1962 in Celle) is a German journalist and television presenter.

Life 
Bauer studied politics, pedagogic and philosophy in Hamburg, Hannover, Grenoble and Kalamazoo. She works for German broadcaster ARD in Tagesthemen. She is married to fellow journalist Ulrich Exner, with whom she has a pair of twin sons.

Awards 
 Deutscher Fernsehpreis
 Bambi
 Telestar 
 Goldener Löwe
 2000: Hanns Joachim Friedrichs Award

References

External links

German television presenters
German television reporters and correspondents
German broadcast news analysts
20th-century German journalists
21st-century German journalists
People from Celle
Living people
1962 births
German women television journalists
German women television presenters
ARD (broadcaster) people
Norddeutscher Rundfunk people
20th-century German women
21st-century German women